BBC South East is the BBC English region serving Kent, East Sussex, most parts of West Sussex and southern parts of Surrey.

The BBC region was created in September 2001 by the joining of the Heathfield transmitter (formerly part of the BBC South region) with the Bluebell Hill and Dover transmitters (from the then BBC London and South East region) to form a new regional TV service. Unlike ITV Meridian (East), it does not serve southern Essex (received from a Bluebell Hill overlap), this area being part of the BBC London region instead.

Services

Television
BBC South East's television output consists of the flagship regional news service South East Today and its main programme is broadcast weeknights at 6:30 pm, with short bulletins throughout the day and during the weekend. A half-hour opt-out during Sunday Politics is produced by an independent production company. In 2020, South East Today joined forces with BBC London News during the COVID-19 Pandemic to keep viewers in both regions informed with the developments about the virus in their areas, although it didn't affect their separate main evening programmes. The joint venture happened again in January 2021.

Radio
The region is the controlling centre for BBC Radio Kent, BBC Radio Surrey and BBC Radio Sussex.

Radio Kent carries local programming between 6am and 7pm from the Tunbridge Wells studio, then simulcasts networked programming along with stations in the BBC South and South East regions until 1am every night. Radio Sussex and Radio Surrey each carry three hours a day of local programming for each county from 6am to 9am, sharing the remainder of their output between 9am and 7pm, then joining with other stations in the BBC South and BBC South East regions at 7pm.

Online and Interactive
BBC South East also produces regional news and local radio pages for BBC Red Button and BBC Local websites for each county.
It also provided regional information for the BBC Ceefax service until its closure in October 2012.

History

Prior to 2001, London, and the whole of the South East  had been considered part of the same editorial region by the BBC, and as a result, received a single regional service, including news programmes London Plus (1984–1989) and Newsroom South East (1989–2001). London had not been afforded the same 'regional' status as the other BBC regions as the bulk of the national content was produced in the capital. This was reflected in the fact that since the launch of regional TV news bulletins in 1957, there was no specialist division within the BBC tasked with producing South East opt-outs.

As a result, the region had fewer local bulletins. Town and Around, the BBC's first attempt at a South East news programme, was gradually integrated into Nationwide, whose production team produced the local bulletins, presented for many years by Bob Wellings. This issue was addressed to a degree with the launch of South East at Six on Monday 4 January 1982 and later, on Monday 3 September 1984, by London Plus – which saw the introduction of short daytime bulletins of the type seen in other BBC regions. Production teams based within the BBC's Current Affairs department continued to produce London Plus until a dedicated South East operation was finally introduced on Tuesday 28 March 1989 with the launch of Newsroom South East from a dedicated news centre at the BBC Elstree Centre in Hertfordshire. Despite the changes throughout the decade, the large region and fewer regional operatives meant the service was still far from ideal.

The size of the region was gradually reduced in stages, starting in 1993 when the Heathfield transmitter serving East Sussex was switched from BBC South East to BBC South. On 16 October 2000, the areas served by the Oxford transmitter were transferred from BBC South East to a new opt out service from BBC South's South Today.

Following the BBC's South East Review of 2001, the London and South East arrangements changed, with BBC London split off as a separate entity and Heathfield viewers rejoining Bluebell Hill and Dover in a new smaller BBC South East region, launched on Monday 3 September 2001 and based in Royal Tunbridge Wells.

Following digital switchover in the south on 7 March 2012, the Whitehawk transmitter in Brighton transferred from the BBC South region to BBC South East. The network had been broadcasting around the fringes of Brighton and Hove prior to switchover and has always been part of the region's remit since 2001; BBC South East now broadcasts terrestrially to the whole city extending along the coast into West Sussex as far as Worthing.

Studios

The regional broadcasting centre is based in Tunbridge Wells, Kent with local radio studios and television bureaux located in Brighton and Guildford and smaller offices in Hastings, Chatham and Dover. BBC South East is the only one of the BBC regions not based in a major city.

The Tunbridge Wells studios are located in The Great Hall, a historic building previously used as public rooms, photography studios, a performance venue, a cinema, a dancing school and until 1980, a nightclub called Carriages. In 1980, the building was severely damaged by fire. It was renovated and bought and now contains an arcade of shops, a hidden car park and the headquarters of BBC South East and BBC Radio Kent. The studios, as is now the trend with most modern developments, can be viewed by the public through tours or through the display windows into the offices from the public areas. Until late 2015, the complex contained a BBC Shop.

See also

 BBC Radio Kent
 BBC Radio Sussex
 BBC Radio Surrey
 BBC Radio London

External links

References 

South East
Mass media in Kent
Mass media in Sussex
Borough of Tunbridge Wells